A Thrust Air 2000 (commonly known as a thrust air coaster) is a unique form of launched roller coaster created by S&S Worldwide, Inc., that uses refrigerated, compressed air to shoot a rubber-wheeled car down a steel track. Do-Dodonpa, located at Fuji-Q Highland, is the only production model in existence. It was built by S&S Worldwide of Logan Utah. It was once the fastest roller coaster in the world and still holds the record of the world's fastest acceleration on a roller coaster. Another model, the Hypersonic XLC, was opened at Kings Dominion in 2001, but it was later closed and put up for sale in 2007. Both models were fabricated by Intermountain Lift, Inc.

Prototype
The prototype Thrust Air 2000 was made in 1999 at the S&S Power plant in Utah.

Stats
Height: .
Climb: 90 degrees
Drop: 90 degrees
Acceleration: 0-80 mph (0-128.7 km/h) in 1.8 sec
Top Speed: about 'Launch System: Ingersoll-Rand screw type compressor
Track layout: Out-and-back'' roller coaster
Track type: I-beam

See also
Accelerator coaster

References

External links
 Thrust Air 2000
 Hypersonic XLC
Official website

 
Launched roller coasters
Amusement rides based on rail transport
Roller coasters manufactured by S&S – Sansei Technologies